The Shchyokino constituency (No.177) was a Russian legislative constituency in Tula Oblast in 1993–2007. The constituency covered upstate southern Tula Oblast. In 2016 Tula Oblast lost one of its three constituencies, which resulted in territory of the former Shchyokino constituency being absorbed by the Tula constituency.

Members elected

Election results

1993

|-
! colspan=2 style="background-color:#E9E9E9;text-align:left;vertical-align:top;" |Candidate
! style="background-color:#E9E9E9;text-align:left;vertical-align:top;" |Party
! style="background-color:#E9E9E9;text-align:right;" |Votes
! style="background-color:#E9E9E9;text-align:right;" |%
|-
|style="background-color:"|
|align=left|Yelena Bogdanova
|align=left|Agrarian Party
|
|15.26%
|-
|style="background-color:"|
|align=left|Sergey Gavrilov
|align=left|Independent
| -
|14.40%
|-
| colspan="5" style="background-color:#E9E9E9;"|
|- style="font-weight:bold"
| colspan="3" style="text-align:left;" | Total
| 
| 100%
|-
| colspan="5" style="background-color:#E9E9E9;"|
|- style="font-weight:bold"
| colspan="4" |Source:
|
|}

1995

|-
! colspan=2 style="background-color:#E9E9E9;text-align:left;vertical-align:top;" |Candidate
! style="background-color:#E9E9E9;text-align:left;vertical-align:top;" |Party
! style="background-color:#E9E9E9;text-align:right;" |Votes
! style="background-color:#E9E9E9;text-align:right;" |%
|-
|style="background-color:"|
|align=left|Nikolay Panarin
|align=left|Independent
|
|20.17%
|-
|style="background-color:"|
|align=left|Yelena Bogdanova (incumbent)
|align=left|Agrarian Party
|
|15.82%
|-
|style="background-color:"|
|align=left|Vladimir Semago
|align=left|Communist Party
|
|13.02%
|-
|style="background-color:#2C299A"|
|align=left|Sergey Gavrilov
|align=left|Congress of Russian Communities
|
|8.12%
|-
|style="background-color:"|
|align=left|Vladimir Kovalev
|align=left|Liberal Democratic Party
|
|5.49%
|-
|style="background-color:"|
|align=left|Anatoly Shatalov
|align=left|Russian Party
|
|5.25%
|-
|style="background-color:#D50000"|
|align=left|Vladimir Seregin
|align=left|Communists and Working Russia - for the Soviet Union
|
|5.11%
|-
|style="background-color:"|
|align=left|Valentin Gubarev
|align=left|Yabloko
|
|4.65%
|-
|style="background-color:"|
|align=left|Yevgeny Khrunov
|align=left|Independent
|
|4.12%
|-
|style="background-color:#1C1A0D"|
|align=left|Svetlana Lymar
|align=left|Forward, Russia!
|
|2.55%
|-
|style="background-color:#DA2021"|
|align=left|Nagapet Karibdzhanyan
|align=left|Ivan Rybkin Bloc
|
|1.62%
|-
|style="background-color:#CE1100"|
|align=left|Valery Nikulin
|align=left|My Fatherland
|
|1.45%
|-
|style="background-color:#000000"|
|colspan=2 |against all
|
|10.04%
|-
| colspan="5" style="background-color:#E9E9E9;"|
|- style="font-weight:bold"
| colspan="3" style="text-align:left;" | Total
| 
| 100%
|-
| colspan="5" style="background-color:#E9E9E9;"|
|- style="font-weight:bold"
| colspan="4" |Source:
|
|}

1999

|-
! colspan=2 style="background-color:#E9E9E9;text-align:left;vertical-align:top;" |Candidate
! style="background-color:#E9E9E9;text-align:left;vertical-align:top;" |Party
! style="background-color:#E9E9E9;text-align:right;" |Votes
! style="background-color:#E9E9E9;text-align:right;" |%
|-
|style="background-color:"|
|align=left|Ivan Khudyakov
|align=left|Communist Party
|
|24.44%
|-
|style="background-color:"|
|align=left|Nikolay Maltsev
|align=left|Independent
|
|14.36%
|-
|style="background-color:#7C273A"|
|align=left|Vladislav Achalov
|align=left|Movement in Support of the Army
|
|7.35%
|-
|style="background-color:"|
|align=left|Vladimir Petrushenkov
|align=left|Independent
|
|5.23%
|-
|style="background-color:"|
|align=left|Viktor Rannikh
|align=left|Independent
|
|3.84%
|-
|style="background-color:"|
|align=left|Vladimir Naumov
|align=left|Independent
|
|3.34%
|-
|style="background-color:#C21022"|
|align=left|Vladimir Kuptsov
|align=left|Party of Pensioners
|
|3.06%
|-
|style="background-color:"|
|align=left|Dmitry Komarov
|align=left|Independent
|
|2.83%
|-
|style="background-color:"|
|align=left|Nikolay Zhukov
|align=left|Independent
|
|2.66%
|-
|style="background-color:"|
|align=left|Vyacheslav Vaneyev
|align=left|Liberal Democratic Party
|
|2.62%
|-
|style="background:#1042A5"| 
|align=left|Vladimir Goverdovsky
|align=left|Union of Right Forces
|
|2.40%
|-
|style="background-color:"|
|align=left|Vladimir Kuznetsov
|align=left|Our Home – Russia
|
|2.06%
|-
|style="background-color:#C62B55"|
|align=left|Oleg Martynenkov
|align=left|Peace, Labour, May
|
|1.75%
|-
|style="background-color:"|
|align=left|Ruslan Kim
|align=left|Independent
|
|1.73%
|-
|style="background-color:"|
|align=left|Aleksandr Butovsky
|align=left|Independent
|
|1.62%
|-
|style="background-color:#084284"|
|align=left|Andrey Tyunyayev
|align=left|Spiritual Heritage
|
|1.38%
|-
|style="background-color:#020266"|
|align=left|Vladimir Pushkin
|align=left|Russian Socialist Party
|
|0.67%
|-
|style="background-color:#000000"|
|colspan=2 |against all
|
|15.58%
|-
| colspan="5" style="background-color:#E9E9E9;"|
|- style="font-weight:bold"
| colspan="3" style="text-align:left;" | Total
| 
| 100%
|-
| colspan="5" style="background-color:#E9E9E9;"|
|- style="font-weight:bold"
| colspan="4" |Source:
|
|}

2003

|-
! colspan=2 style="background-color:#E9E9E9;text-align:left;vertical-align:top;" |Candidate
! style="background-color:#E9E9E9;text-align:left;vertical-align:top;" |Party
! style="background-color:#E9E9E9;text-align:right;" |Votes
! style="background-color:#E9E9E9;text-align:right;" |%
|-
|style="background-color:"|
|align=left|Andrey Samoshin
|align=left|Independent
|
|23.44%
|-
|style="background-color:"|
|align=left|Yelena Drapeko
|align=left|Communist Party
|
|17.82%
|-
|style="background-color:"|
|align=left|Mikhail Kazakov
|align=left|Independent
|
|11.49%
|-
|style="background-color:"|
|align=left|Sergey Zalyotin
|align=left|Independent
|
|9.27%
|-
|style="background-color:"|
|align=left|Aleksandr Yashin
|align=left|United Russia
|
|8.42%
|-
|style="background-color:"|
|align=left|Vyacheslav Kiselev
|align=left|Independent
|
|4.66%
|-
|style="background-color:"|
|align=left|Gennady Kazakov
|align=left|Independent
|
|3.61%
|-
|style="background-color:"|
|align=left|Mikhail Kreymer
|align=left|Independent
|
|3.58%
|-
|style="background-color:"|
|align=left|Vladimir Isayev
|align=left|Liberal Democratic Party
|
|1.95%
|-
|style="background-color:"|
|align=left|Yelena Shestopalova
|align=left|Independent
|
|0.85%
|-
|style="background-color:"|
|align=left|Artashes Khoralov
|align=left|Independent
|
|0.75%
|-
|style="background-color:"|
|align=left|Anatoly Malykhin
|align=left|Independent
|
|0.54%
|-
|style="background-color:#004090"|
|align=left|Aleksandr Kharlamov
|align=left|New Course — Automobile Russia
|
|0.54%
|-
|style="background-color:#000000"|
|colspan=2 |against all
|
|11.01%
|-
| colspan="5" style="background-color:#E9E9E9;"|
|- style="font-weight:bold"
| colspan="3" style="text-align:left;" | Total
| 
| 100%
|-
| colspan="5" style="background-color:#E9E9E9;"|
|- style="font-weight:bold"
| colspan="4" |Source:
|
|}

Notes

References

Obsolete Russian legislative constituencies
Politics of Tula Oblast